This article lists the winners and nominees for the Black Reel Award for Outstanding Supporting Actor in a Motion Picture. Oscar-nominated or winning performances also honored with nominations or wins at the Black Reel Awards include Barkhad Abdi (Captain Phillips), Morgan Freeman (Million Dollar Baby), Michael Clarke Duncan (The Green Mile), Jamie Foxx (Collateral), Djimon Hounsou (Blood Diamond, In America) and Eddie Murphy (Dreamgirls).

Winners and nominees
Winners are listed first and highlighted in bold.

2000s

2010s
{| class="wikitable" style="width:100%;"
|- style="background:#bebebe;"
! style="width:11%;"| Year
! style="width:35%;"| Actor
! style="width:49%;"| Film
! style="width:5%;"| Ref
|-
| rowspan="6" align="center"| 2010
|- style="background:#B0C4DE"
| Anthony Mackie
| The Hurt Locker
| rowspan="6" align="center"| 
|-
| Charles S. Dutton
| American Violet
|-
| Chiwetel Ejiofor
| 2012
|-
| Lenny Kravitz
| Precious
|-
| Derek Luke
| Madea Goes to Jail
|-
| rowspan="6" align="center"| 2011
|- style="background:#B0C4DE"
| Wesley Snipes
| Brooklyn's Finest
| rowspan="6" align="center"| 
|-
| Sean Combs
| Get Him to the Greek
|-
| Laurence Fishburne
| Predator
|-
| Brandon T. Jackson
| Percy Jackson & the Olympians: The Lightning Thief
|-
| Samuel L. Jackson
| Mother and Child
|-
| rowspan="6" align="center"| 2012
|- style="background:#B0C4DE"
| Don Cheadle
| The Guard
| rowspan="6" align="center"| 
|-
| Mike Epps
| Jumping the Broom
|-
| Laurence Fishburne
| Contagion
|-
| Anthony Mackie
| The Adjustment Bureau
|-
| Isiah Whitlock Jr.
| Cedar Rapids
|-
| rowspan="6" align="center"| 2013
|- style="background:#B0C4DE"
| Samuel L. Jackson
| Django Unchained
| rowspan="6" align="center"| 
|-
| Mike Epps
| Sparkle
|-
| Dwight Henry
| Beasts of the Southern Wild
|-
| David Oyelowo
| Middle of Nowhere
|-
| Nate Parker
| Arbitrage
|-
| rowspan="6" align="center"| 2014
|- style="background:#B0C4DE"
| Barkhad Abdi
| Captain Phillips | rowspan="6" align="center"| 
|-
| David Oyelowo
| The Butler
|-
| Nate Parker
| Ain't Them Bodies Saints
|-
| Tequan Richmond
| Blue Caprice
|-
| Keith Stanfield
| Short Term 12
|-
| rowspan="6" align="center"| 2015
|- style="background:#B0C4DE"
| Wendell Pierce| Selma
| rowspan="6" align="center"| 
|-
| Nelsan Ellis
| Get On Up
|-
| David Oyelowo
| A Most Violent Year
|-
| Tyler Perry
| Gone Girl
|-
| Michael K. Williams
| The Gambler
|-
| rowspan="6" align="center"| 2016
|- style="background:#B0C4DE"
| Idris Elba
| Beasts of No Nation
| rowspan="6" align="center"| 
|-
| Chiwetel Ejiofor
| The Martian
|-
| Corey Hawkins
| rowspan="2"| Straight Outta Compton
|-
| Jason Mitchell
|-
| Forest Whitaker
| Southpaw
|-
| rowspan="6" align="center"| 2017
|- style="background:#B0C4DE"
| Mahershala Ali
| Moonlight | rowspan="6" align="center"| 
|-
| Jovan Adepo
| rowspan=2| Fences
|-
| Stephen Henderson
|-
| André Holland
| rowspan=2|Moonlight
|-
| Ashton Sanders
|-
| rowspan="6" align="center"| 2018
|- style="background:#B0C4DE"
| Jason Mitchell| Mudbound
| rowspan="6" align="center"| 
|-
| Idris Elba
| Molly's Game
|-
| Jamie Foxx
| Baby Driver
|-
| Laurence Fishburne
| Last Flag Flying
|-
| Lil Rel Howery
| Get Out
|-
| rowspan="6" style="text-align:center;" | 2019 
|- style="background:#B0C4DE"
| Michael B. Jordan
| Black Panther
| rowspan="5" align="center"| 
|-
| Daniel Kaluuya
| Widows 
|-
| Mahershala Ali
| Green Book '|-
| Russell Hornsby
| The Hate U Give|-
| Brian Tyree Henry
| If Beale Street Could Talk|}

2020s

Multiple nominations and wins
Multiple wins
 2 Wins
 Don Cheadle
 Jamie Foxx
 Djimon Hounsou
 Wesley Snipes

Multiple nominations

 5 nominations
 Chiwetel Ejiofor
 Jamie Foxx
 Jeffrey Wright

 4 nominations
 Laurence Fishburne

 3 nominations
 Idris Elba
 Morgan Freeman
 Terrence Howard
 David Oyelowo
 Forest Whitaker

 2 nominations
 Mahershala Ali
 Anthony Anderson
 Cedric the Entertainer
 Don Cheadle
 Mos Def
 Colman Domingo
 Mike Epps
 Brian Tyree Henry
 Aldis Hodge
 Andre Holland
 Djimon Hounsou
 Brandon T. Jackson
 Samuel L. Jackson
 Daniel Kaluuya
 Anthony Mackie
 Jason Mitchell
 Eddie Murphy
 Nate Parker
 Ving Rhames
 Wesley Snipes
 LaKeith Stanfield
 Michael K. Williams

Multiple nominations from the same film
 Terrence Howard (winner) and Ludacris in Crash (2006)
 Jeffrey Wright (winner), Mos Def and Eamonn Walker in Cadillac Records (2008)
 Corey Hawkins and Jason Mitchell in Straight Outta Compton (2016)
 Mahershala Ali (winner), Andre Holland & Ashton Sanders in Moonlight (2017)
 Jovan Adepo & Stephen Henderson in Fences (2017) 
 Aldis Hodge & Leslie Odom Jr. in One Night in Miami... (2021)
 Idris Elba & LaKeith Stanfield in The Harder They Fall'' (2022)

Age superlatives

References

Black Reel Awards